

Futsal European Clubs Championship

Top League

Promotion tournament

National Cup

Final Four

Top League Cup

First League

First stage

First group

Second group

Third group

Fourth group

Second stage

Group A

Group B

Second League

Women's League

Women's National Cup

References

Russia
Seasons in Russian futsal
futsal
futsal